Gustavo David Zamudio Veloso (born April 11, 1986 in Chile), is a Chilean former footballer. His last club was Malleco Unido in the Segunda División Profesional de Chile. He took to soccer while attending Universidad Católica, and has played for several teams of Chile, Hong Kong and USA.

References

External links

Gustavo Zamudio at playmakerstats.com (English version of ceroacero.es)

1985 births
Living people
Sportspeople from Viña del Mar
Chilean footballers
Chilean expatriate footballers
Club Deportivo Universidad Católica footballers
Deportes La Serena footballers
Magallanes footballers
Deportes Magallanes footballers
Coquimbo Unido footballers
San Luis de Quillota footballers
Kitchee SC players
Rochester New York FC players
Rangers de Talca footballers
Malleco Unido footballers
Chilean Primera División players
Primera B de Chile players
Hong Kong First Division League players
USL Championship players
Segunda División Profesional de Chile players
Expatriate footballers in Hong Kong
Expatriate soccer players in the United States
Chilean expatriate sportspeople in Hong Kong
Chilean expatriate sportspeople in the United States
Association football midfielders
Hong Kong League XI representative players